The Brit Awards 1977 was a United Kingdom popular music award special event to mark both 100 years since Thomas Edison invented the phonograph and the Silver Jubilee of Elizabeth II. The awards were given for the previous 25 years of her reign. It was originally named "The British Record Industry Britannia Awards", and was the first event of the Brit Awards, which became an annual event after 1982. The event was organised and run by the British Phonographic Industry, was broadcast by the ITV television network and took place on 18 October 1977 at Wembley Conference Centre in London. The host was Michael Aspel.

Winners and nominees

Multiple nominations and awards
The following artists received multiple awards and/or nominations, not counting Outstanding Contribution to Music.

References

External links
1977 Brit Awards at Brits.co.uk

Brit Awards
Brit Awards
BRIT Awards
BRIT Awards
Brit Awards
Brit Awards